Carex savaiiensis is a tussock-forming perennial in the family Cyperaceae. It is native to parts of Samoa.

See also
 List of Carex species

References

savaiiensis
Plants described in 1935
Taxa named by Georg Kükenthal
Flora of Samoa